The Wendy's massacre was a mass murder that took place in a Wendy's fast-food restaurant at 40-12 Main Street in Flushing, Queens, New York City, New York, on May 24, 2000. Seven employees were shot in the head and five of them died. The killings were committed by former Wendy's employee John Taylor along with Craig Godineaux, who had planned to rob the restaurant's safe. Taylor was subsequently sentenced to death (later changed to life imprisonment without parole), while Godineaux was sentenced to life in prison. After the shooting, the Wendy’s location was closed and boarded up until it was eventually re-opened as a shopping center in 2011.

Robbery and killing of employees
The killings were carried out by 36-year-old John Taylor, a former employee of the restaurant, and his accomplice Craig Godineaux. The robbery was carefully planned, as Taylor forced his former manager there, Jean Auguste, to summon the six employees to his office on the pretense of having an important meeting. Taylor and Godineaux took the seven employees into the restaurant's freezer, bound and gagged them at gunpoint, put plastic bags over their heads, and then shot each of them in the head with a Bryco-Jennings Model J38 .380 caliber semi-automatic pistol. All but two of them died. One of the two survivors, Patricio Castro, dialed 9-1-1. When police arrived, they found all the victims and discovered $2,400 missing from the safe.

Arrests and trial
The New York City Police Department (NYPD) arrested Taylor and Godineaux less than 48 hours after the killings. Evidence quickly mounted against the pair, including eyewitness testimony, ballistics, and fingerprints. On January 22, 2001, Godineaux pleaded guilty and was later sentenced to life in prison. Judge Steven W. Fisher instructed the jury that he would most likely sentence Taylor to a sentence of 175 years in prison if the jury did not return a unanimous verdict on the death penalty. On November 19, 2002, Taylor was convicted of five counts of first degree murder. One week later, on November 26, the jury sentenced Taylor to death.

Post-conviction
In 2004, New York state's death penalty statute was declared unconstitutional by the New York Court of Appeals due to a flaw in its mandated instructions to the jury. The Queens District Attorney's Office fought to have Taylor's case declared an exception to the decision, but were unsuccessful. As a result, on October 23, 2007, the Court of Appeals of the State of New York vacated the death penalty portion of Taylor's verdict. At this time, Taylor was the last remaining inmate on death row in New York. On November 29, 2007, Taylor was re-sentenced to life without parole for the five murders.  

Taylor is currently serving his sentence at the Clinton Correctional Facility in Dannemora, New York, as inmate #03A0158, while Godineaux is currently serving his sentence at the Auburn Correctional Facility in Auburn, New York, as inmate #01A1186.

Victims
Killed in the massacre were:
Jean Auguste, 27
Ali Ibadat, 40
Jeremy Mele, 19
Ramon Nazario, 44
Anita Smith, 23
Seriously wounded:
 Ja Quione Johnson, 18
 Patricio (Patrick) Castro, 23

References

Notes

Mass murder in 2000
Deaths by firearm in Queens, New York
Murder in New York City
2000 mass shootings in the United States
Mass shootings in the United States
2000 murders in the United States
2000 in New York City
Wendy's International
Crimes in Queens, New York
Attacks in the United States in 2000
Attacks on restaurants in North America
May 2000 events in the United States
Mass shootings in New York (state)
Flushing, Queens
2000s in Queens
Mass shootings in New York City